Żabieniec may refer to the following places:
Żabieniec, Kuyavian-Pomeranian Voivodeship (north-central Poland)
Żabieniec, Garwolin County in Masovian Voivodeship (east-central Poland)
Żabieniec, Piaseczno County in Masovian Voivodeship (east-central Poland)
Żabieniec, Pruszków County in Masovian Voivodeship (east-central Poland)
Żabieniec, Warmian-Masurian Voivodeship (north Poland)